The inaugural 2020 Individual World Wrestling Cup was held in Belgrade, Serbia from 12–18 December 2020. It was a replacement event for the 2020 World Championships, which should have taken place in the same location, but since some criteria were not fulfilled, such as not less than 8 top nations from the previous championships to participate, the event is not counted as world championships. The Cup took place amidst the COVID-19 pandemic, which caused this and other problems. The United States for instance chose not to participate.

Medal table

Team ranking

Medal summary

Men's freestyle

Men's Greco-Roman

Women's freestyle

References

External links
Official website

 
World Wrestling Cup
World Wrestling Cup
2020 World Cup
Wrestling World Cup
World Wrestling Cup